"Show Me the Way Back to Your Heart" is a 1997 song by American singer and songwriter Gloria Estefan. It was released as the first and last promotional and fifth overall single from her seventh studio album, Destiny. The song is written by American songwriter Diane Warren as an English rendition of the song "S'aimer encore une fois" ("Still Love Once Again") by Canadian singer Katee Julien (which had lyrics in French by Eddy Marnay). It was released exclusively to Brazil as a promotional single. The single included another version of the song with a simultaneous Portuguese translation  by Robson Castro.

The song was used for the 90 Millas World Tour in 2008 only in Barcelona. It was also sung in selected dates during the 1997 Evolution World Tour, as well as Diane Warren's "Love Song" Special, performed for PBS in 2010.

Critical reception
The Daily Vault's Mark Millan wrote that "Show Me the Way Back to Your Heart" is "almost perfect, and while [it] could have been another signature mushy Warren ballad, in the hands of the reenergized Miami Sound Machine, it's transformed into an acoustic masterpiece." Ian Fortnam from NME said the song has "potential" to become an "enormo-hit".

Other versions
Luis Fonsi recorded a Spanish version of this song titled "Dime Como Vuelvo a Tener tu Corazón," and was included on his album Eterno.

Brian McKnight also sang a version on his Anytime album in 1997.

Cosima De Vito covered the song on her 2004 self-titled debut album.

Track listing

References

  Gloria Estefan Discography Database

1997 singles
Gloria Estefan songs
Songs written by Diane Warren